Davide Rigon (born 26 August 1986) is an Italian professional racing driver who is currently competing in the FIA World Endurance Championship and other selected GT races for AF Corse. He is also currently part of the Scuderia Ferrari Formula One test driver team.

Career
Starting out in Formula BMW ADAC in 2003, Thiene-born Rigon progressed to the Italian Formula Renault Championship and Italian Formula Three. He won the Formula Azzurra title in 2005, and finished second in Italian Formula Three the following year.

In 2007, Rigon won the Euroseries 3000 championship, winning three races. He also raced for Italy in the 2007–08 A1 Grand Prix season. In 2008, he competed in the GT2 class of the FIA GT Championship for BMS Scuderia Italia, and also in International Formula Master, while also racing for Beijing Guoan in the inaugural 2008 Superleague Formula season. Guoan were rated amongst the outsiders for the title, but Rigon defied that and led them to the championship, with three wins.

During the off-season, Rigon joined up with Trident Racing to compete in the fourth round of the 2008–09 GP2 Asia Series season in Qatar. He scored his first points in the series, with a seventh at the penultimate race in Bahrain. He followed that up with a third in the final race, as he finished 17th in the championship.

He continued with the team into the 2009 GP2 Series season, but was replaced after four rounds by Rodolfo González despite outpacing team-mate Ricardo Teixeira all season. He did however return for the Hungarian rounds of the championship, and remained with the team for the rest of the season. He returned to Superleague Formula, but with the Olympiacos CFP team instead of Beijing Guoan. He reclaimed the championship in 2010 whilst driving for the R.S.C. Anderlecht team.

Rigon returned to the GP2 Series for 2011 with the Coloni team. During the first round of the season, at Istanbul Park, he was involved in a crash with Julián Leal and suffered multiple fractures to his tibia and fibula. He was replaced by compatriot Kevin Ceccon, and later Luca Filippi, and was restricted to 29th in the championship as a result of his injury.

Rigon switched to sports car racing in 2012, and joined Kessel Racing for the Blancpain Endurance Series. In the 2013 season, he won at Monza and ended fourth in the Pro Cup with teammates Daniel Zampieri and César Ramos. Also in 2013, he drove in four rounds of the FIA World Endurance Championship with 8 Star Motorsports, also in a Ferrari 458 Italia. He got a win and two second-place finishes, helping the team to win the GTE-Am class championship. The Italian also won two races out of four in the International GT Open partnering with Andrea Montermini in a Scuderia Villorba Ferrari.

Rigon drove a GTE-Pro class Ferrari F458 Italia for AF Corse full-time for the 2014 FIA World Endurance Championship.

Racing record

Career summary

* Season still in progress.

Complete Formula Renault 3.5 Series results
(key) (Races in bold indicate pole position) (Races in italics indicate fastest lap)

Superleague Formula results

2008–2009
(Races in bold indicate pole position) (Races in italics indicate fastest lap)

2009 Super Final results
Super Final results in 2009 did not count for points towards the main championship.

2010

  † Non-championship event.

Complete GP2 Series results
(key) (Races in bold indicate pole position) (Races in italics indicate fastest lap)

Complete GP2 Asia Series results
(key) (Races in bold indicate pole position) (Races in italics indicate fastest lap)

Complete FIA World Endurance Championship results
(key) (Races in bold indicate pole position; races in italics indicate fastest lap)

Complete 24 Hours of Le Mans results

Complete IMSA SportsCar Championship results
(key) (Races in bold indicate pole position; races in italics indicate fastest lap)

* Season still in progress.

Complete European Le Mans Series results
(key) (Races in bold indicate pole position; results in italics indicate fastest lap)

References

External links
 
 

1986 births
Living people
Sportspeople from the Province of Vicenza
Italian racing drivers
Olympiacos CFP (Superleague Formula team) drivers
Formula BMW ADAC drivers
Italian Formula Renault 2.0 drivers
Italian Formula Three Championship drivers
Formula Azzurra drivers
A1 Grand Prix Rookie drivers
Auto GP drivers
International Formula Master drivers
FIA GT Championship drivers
Superleague Formula drivers
GP2 Series drivers
GP2 Asia Series drivers
World Series Formula V8 3.5 drivers
Superstars Series drivers
Blancpain Endurance Series drivers
FIA World Endurance Championship drivers
International GT Open drivers
24 Hours of Daytona drivers
24 Hours of Le Mans drivers
WeatherTech SportsCar Championship drivers
24 Hours of Spa drivers
People from Thiene
A1 Grand Prix drivers
AF Corse drivers
ADAC GT Masters drivers
European Le Mans Series drivers
Asian Le Mans Series drivers
Victory Engineering drivers
Piquet GP drivers
Trident Racing drivers
Scuderia Coloni drivers
SMP Racing drivers
BVM Target drivers
Ferrari Competizioni GT drivers
Iron Lynx drivers